Louis Kaye was the pseudonym of Noel Wilson Norman (14 July 1901 - 19 April 1981), an Australian novelist and short story writer. He also published short stories under the names Grant Doyle Cooper and James Linnel.

He was born in Claremont, Tasmania to a well-connected Lindisfarne family but was more interested in an adventurous outback life than one of business and politics. From 1917 he was to make frequent forays into the Western Australian bush to experience first-hand life in the bush and deserts of outback Australia. His experience of aboriginal life was augmented by reading the works of anthropologist Baldwin Spencer.

He was already a successful contributor of short stories to overseas magazines in 1931 when he wrote his first novel, Tybal Men, set in a WA sheep station. He is regarded as giving a realistic depiction of bush life and aboriginal culture, though criticised for emulating the "violent excesses of the American cowboy novel".

His brother Don (Donald Manners Thirkell) Norman (24 April 1909 - 10 March 2001) was a writer (e.g. Errol Flynn : the Tasmanian story W.N. Hurst and E.L. Metcalf, Hobart c1981 ) and historian.

Short stories
A partial list of Kaye's short stories includes:

Off the Trail in Everybody’s Magazine May 1927
The Gold Carriers in Everybody’s Magazine Nov 1927
The Tracks of Sonya in The Passing Show Oct 1 1932
The Lee Rail in The Australian Journal May 1937 
Widow’s Cruise in The Passing Show Sep 25 1937
Well - Let’s Laugh! in The Passing Show Jan 22 1938
Strange Ones in The Passing Show Feb 19 1938
Boomerang in London Evening News Jul 28 1938
Old Man Kangaroo in Adventure Jun 1940
Walk to Glory in The Saturday Evening Post Nov 2 1940
Desert Gold in Blue Book Jan 1941
The Brumby Car in Colliers Feb 20 1943
Kangaroo Rifle in Blue Book May 1945
Mark of Brotherhood in Blue Book Aug 1945
Back Country Boy in Blue Book Apr 1948
By the Last Fires in Short Stories May 1950
The Necklet in Short Stories Oct 1950
The Storm Strip in Blue Book Feb 1951

Novels
Tybal Men pub. Wright & Brown, London 1931
also as Tybal Men - A Struggle For Survival in the Outback Angus and Robertson, Sydney 1988 
Trail of Plunder pub. Wright & Brown, London 1931
Desert Herbage pub. Wright & Brown, London 1932
The End of the Trail pub. Wright & Brown, London 1933
The Desert Boss pub. Wright & Brown, London 1934
Tightened Belts pub. Wright & Brown, London 1934
Pathways of Free Men pub. Wright & Brown, London 1935
The Dark Gods pub. Wright & Brown, London 1935
The Lonely Land pub. Wright & Brown, London 1935
Black Wilderness pub. Wright & Brown, London 1936
Darkened Camps London : Wright & Brown, 1936
Vanished Legion pub. Wright & Brown, London 1937
Tracks of Levask pub. Wright & Brown, London 1938

Sources
Oxford Companion to Australian Literature ed. W H Wilde, Joy Hooton, Barry Andrews, Oxford University Press 1994
The Bibliography of Australian Literature John Arnold, John Hay University of Queensland Press

See also
 Australian outback literature of the 20th century

References

1901 births
1981 deaths
20th-century Australian novelists
Australian male novelists
Australian male short story writers
20th-century Australian short story writers
20th-century Australian male writers